Aetea is a genus of bryozoans belonging to the family Aeteidae.

The genus has cosmopolitan distribution.

Species:

Aetea americana 
Aetea anguina 
Aetea arcuata 
Aetea australis 
Aetea boninensis 
Aetea crosslandi 
Aetea cultrata 
Aetea curta 
Aetea dilatata 
Aetea lepadiformis 
Aetea ligulata 
Aetea lineata 
Aetea lingulata 
Aetea longicollis 
Aetea paraligulata 
Aetea pseudoanguina 
Aetea sica 
Aetea truncata

References

Bryozoan genera